A series of Welsh rebellions broke out in the century following the conquest of Wales by Edward I in 1283, which had brought the whole of Wales under the control of the Kingdom of England for the first time. In 1400, Welsh discontent with English rule in Wales culminated in the Welsh Revolt, a major uprising led by Owain Glyndŵr, who achieved de facto control over much of the country in the following years. The rebellion petered out after 1409, and after complete English control was restored in 1415 no further major rebellions occurred.

End of an independent Wales 

Following the uniting of Wales under the rule of the Llywelyn princes, Edward I King of England led 15,000 men to capture Wales following multiple previous failed attempts by English monarchs to maintain a grip on Wales. Resistance in Wales was led by the Prince of Wales Llywelyn ap Gruffydd (Llywelyn the Last) and he also made an attempt to recruit more Welsh soldiers in mid-Wales. Llywelyn was killed in the Battle of Orewin Bridge by English soldiers in an ambush trick under the guise of discussions. His head was paraded through London and placed on a Tower of London spike with a mocking crown of laurel leaves.

Dafydd ap Gruffydd (Llywelyn's brother) 
Llywelyn's brother Dafydd took over the leadership of the Welsh fighters, but was captured in 1283. He was dragged through the streets of Shrewsbury by a horse, hanged, revived and disembowelled by English officials. His bowels were thrown into a fire as he watched. Finally, his head was cut off and placed on a Tower of London spike next to his brother Llywelyn, and his body cut into quarters.

Following the deaths of Llywelyn and Dafydd, Edward sought to end Welsh independence, and introduced the royal ordinance of the Statute of Rhuddlan in 1284. The statute was a constitutional change causing Wales to lose its de facto independence and formed the Principality of Wales within the "Realm of England". The name refers to Rhuddlan Castle in Denbighshire, where it was first promulgated on 19 March 1284. The statute confirmed the annexation of Wales and introduced English common law to Wales for criminal cases, while civil cases were still dealt with under the Welsh laws of Hywel Dda.

Rhys ap Maredudd
Rhys ap Maredudd was the great-grandson of The Lord Rhys and he led a Welsh revolt in south Wales in 1287–88. 

In 1277, Rhys ap Maredudd submitted to English king Edward I, and surrendered the castle of Dinefwr, but was allowed to retain Dryslwyn. In 1282 Llywelyn ap Gruffydd presented "grievances" on the behalf of Rhys against the royal officers in west Wales. Rhys abstained from the revolt in West Wales and assisted Edward in attacking Llanbadarn and patrolling Ceredigion on behalf of the English king in the absence of the royal commander. 

After 1283 Rhys was recognized as ' dominus de Estretewy ' and granted homage of Welsh chieftains in north Carmarthenshire. He married Ada de Hastings in 1285, receiving the castle of Newcastle Emlyn. He revolted against Edward, 8 June 1287 in Iscennen expelling Giffard, he continued across west Wales to Llanbadarn and possibly Brycheiniog. The regent directed royal troops to Dryslwyn, which was taken from Rhys around the 5 September and eventually Newcastle Emlyn on 20 January 1288. He was on the run in 1289 and a writ wrote that he was likely to attempt an escape to Ireland.  Rhys was eventually caught and executed in 1292 at York.

Madog ap Llywelyn 

Madog ap Llywelyn led a Welsh revolt in 1294–95 against English rule in Wales, and was proclaimed "Prince of Wales".  On (29 September) 1294, Madog put himself at the head of a national revolt. The revolt was a response to new royal administrators in north and west Wales and the imposition of taxes such as that levied on one fifteenth of all movables. As a royal prince descended directly from Owain Gwynedd and a distant cousin of the last Prince of Aberffraw (Dafydd ap Gruffudd, the executed brother of Llywelyn), Madog declared himself to be the lawful successor and assumed the royal titles of his predecessors including that of Prince of Wales (an example of which can be seen in the so-called Penmachno Document). The uprising had been planned for months and attacks occurred on the same day across Wales. While Madog acted in the north, the attacks in mid and south Wales were led by Cynan ap Maredudd, Maelgwn ap Rhys, and Morgan ap Maredudd of Gwynllwg in Glamorgan. The rebel leaders hoped that by the end of September King Edward and most of his forces would be in France on a planned campaign. However, due to bad weather Edward's army had not yet sailed and he quickly cancelled the French campaign to deal with the Welsh uprising.

In December 1294 King Edward led an army into north Wales to quell the revolt, stopping at Wrexham, Denbigh, Abergele, and elsewhere on his way to Conwy Castle, which he reached shortly before Christmas. His campaign was timely, for several castles remained in serious danger: Harlech Castle was defended at one point by just 37 men. Edward himself was ambushed and retreated to Conwy Castle, losing his baggage train. The town of Conwy was burnt down and Edward besieged until he was relieved by his navy in 1295.

The crucial battle between Madog's men and those of the English crown was the Battle of Maes Moydog in Powys on 5 March 1295. Surprised by an army led by the Earl of Warwick, the Welsh army regained their composure and successfully defended against an English cavalry charge by using the "porcupine" pike men formation, or schiltron, a formation favoured by the Scots armies against English knights. However, arrows from English archers inflicted heavy losses, and in a pursuit of the Welsh from the battlefield, many Welsh soldiers drowned trying to cross a swollen river. Madog barely escaped from this episode with his life and was a fugitive until his capture by Ynyr Fychan of Nannau and hand over to John de Havering in Snowdonia in late July or early August 1295.

Llywelyn Bren 

Llywelyn Bren was a nobleman who led a 1316 revolt in Wales in the reign of King Edward II of England. When he was commanded to appear before the king, Llywelyn raised an army of Welsh Glamorgan men which laid siege to Caerphilly Castle. The rebellion spread throughout the south Wales valleys and other castles were attacked, but this uprising only lasted a few weeks. It marked the last serious challenge to English rule in Wales until the attempts of Owain Lawgoch to invade with French support in the 1370s. Hugh Despenser the Younger's unlawful execution of Llywelyn Bren helped to lead to the eventual overthrow of both Edward II and Hugh.

Owain Lawgoch 

In May 1372 in Paris, Owain Lawgoch announced that he intended to claim the throne of Wales. Owain set sail from Harfleur with money borrowed from Charles V. Owain first attacked the island of Guernsey, and was still there when a message arrived from Charles ordering him to abandon the expedition in order to go to Castile to seek ships to attack La Rochelle.

In 1377 there were reports that Owain was planning another expedition, this time with help from Castile. The alarmed English government sent a spy, the Scot John Lamb, to assassinate Owain, who had been given the task of besieging Mortagne-sur-Gironde in Poitou. Lamb gained Owain's confidence and became his chamberlain, which gave him the opportunity to stab Owain to death in July 1378, something Walker described as 'a sad end to a flamboyant career'. The Issue Roll of the Exchequer dated 4 December 1378 records "To John Lamb, an esquire from Scotland, because he lately killed Owynn de Gales, a rebel and enemy of the King in France ... £20". Owain was buried at the Church of St. Leger, near Cognac, France.

With the assassination of Owain Lawgoch the senior line of the House of Aberffraw became extinct. As a result, the claim to the title 'Prince of Wales' fell to the other royal dynasties, of Deheubarth and Powys. The leading heir in this respect was Owain Glyndŵr, who was descended from both dynasties.

Owain Glyndŵr 

The immediate and initial cause of Owain Glyndŵr's rebellion is likely the incursion onto his land by Baron Grey of Ruthin and the late delivery of a letter requiring Glyndŵr to provide armed services to King Henry IV of England, as well as unfair mediation of this dispute by the English king. Glyndŵr was pronounced Prince of Wales in Glyndyfrdwy on 16 September 1400; and with his armies he proceeded to attack English towns in north-east Wales with guerilla tactics, disappearing into the mountains. Allies of Glyndŵr, the Tudor family then captured Conwy Castle at Easter 1401 and in the same year Glyndŵr was victorious against English forces in Pumlumon. He gathered much support across Wales. King Henry led several attempted invasions of Wales but with limited success. Bad weather and the guerilla tactics of Glyndŵr created a mythical status for him, a man at one with the elements who had control over the weather. 

The immediate response of the English was to pass a series of coercive and discriminatory laws in 1401 and 1402, designed to quell the rebellion. These laws imposed punitive sanctions against Welsh and assert English dominance in Wales. The laws failed in their immediate effect as the resentment they caused drove up the numbers taking up arms.

In 1404, Glyndŵr captured Aberystwyth and Harlech castles, formed an agreement with the French and held a Senedd at Machynlleth. He was crowned Prince of Wales with emissaries from Scotland, France, and Castille in Spain. French assistance arrived in 1405, and much of Wales was in Glyndŵr's control. In 1406 Glyndŵr wrote the Pennal Letter at Pennal near Machynlleth, offering Welsh allegiance to the Avignon Pope rather than the Rome Pope and seeking recognition of St David as the seat of the bishop of Wales, clerics fluent in Welsh, two Welsh universities, retention of Welsh Church revenues and that the "usurper" Henry IV should be excommunicated. The French did not respond and the rebellion began to falter. Aberystwyth Castle was lost in 1408 and Harlech Castle in 1409; and Glyndŵr was forced to retreat to the Welsh mountains, from where he continued occasional guerilla raids. It is likely that he died in 1416 at Kentchurch at the Anglo-Welsh border at the home of his daughter Alys. Glyndŵr remains an icon of Welsh identity and nationalism from the 18th century until today. His legacy at the time, however, was the penal laws, which remained in force long after the rebellion. Although never consistently enforced, their presence had the effect of makin the Welsh second class citizens in their own nation, until they were obsoleted by the Laws in Wales Acts 1535 and 1542.

See also 
 Wales in the Middle Ages
 List of Anglo-Welsh wars
 Welsh Revolt
 Wars of Scottish Independence
 Irish War of Independence

References

Bibliography 

 
 
 
 
 

 
 
 

History of Wales
Wars of the Middle Ages
Welsh history timelines
Military history of Wales
Wales
Welsh wars
England–Wales relations
Anglo-Welsh
 
13th-century rebellions
13th century in Wales
14th century in Wales
14th-century rebellions
15th-century rebellions
15th century in Wales
Medieval Wales
Principality of Wales